The following is an overview of Edicts of Ashoka, and where they are located.

Minor Rock Edict

Kandahar, Afghanistan
Lampaka, Afghanistan
Bahapur, Delhi
Bairat, near Jaipur, Rajasthan
Bhabru, second hill at Bairat, Rajasthan
Gujarra, near Jhansi, Datia district, Madhya Pradesh
Rupnath, on the Kaimur Hills near Jabalpur, Madhya Pradesh
Ratanpurwa, on the Kaimur Hills near Kharauli-Basaha Road, Bihar
Panguraria, Sehore district, Madhya Pradesh
Sohgaura, Gorakhpur district, Uttar Pradesh
Sahasram, Rohtas district, Bihar
Barabar Caves, Bihar (donatory inscriptions to the Ājīvika sect)
Mahasthan, Bogra district, Bangladesh
Rajula-Mandagiri, near Pattikonda, Kurnool district, Andhra Pradesh
Suvarnagiri (Jonnagiri), Kurnool district, Andhra Pradesh
Palkigundu and Gavimath, Koppal district, Karnataka
Brahmagiri, Chitradurga district, Karnataka
Jatinga-Rameshwara, near Brahmagiri, Karnataka
Siddapur, near Brahmagiri, Karnataka
Maski, Raichur district, Karnataka
Nittur, Bellary district, Karnataka
Udegolam, Bellary district, Karnataka

Minor Pillar Edicts

Lumbini (Rummindei), Rupandehi district, Nepal (the upper part broke off when struck by lightning; the original horse capital mentioned by Xuanzang is missing)
Nigali-Sagar (or Nigliva), near Lumbini, Rupandehi district, Nepal (originally near the Buddha Konakarnana stupa)
Sarnath, near Varanasi, Uttar Pradesh (Pillar Inscription, Schism Edict)
Allahabad, Uttar Pradesh (originally located at Kausambi and probably moved to Allahabad by Jahangir; Pillar Edicts I-VI, Queen's Edict, Schism Edict)
Sanchi, near Bhopal, Madhya Pradesh (Schism Edict)

Major Rock Edicts (set of 14)

Kandahar Greek Inscription  (portions of Rock Edicts 12 and 13in Greek) and  Kandahar Bilingual Rock Inscription (bilingual Greek-Aramaic), in Kandahar, Afghanistan.
Shahbazgarhi, Khyber Pakhtunkhwa, Pakistan (in Kharosthi script)
Mansehra Rock Edicts, Mansehra, Khyber Pakhtunkhwa province, Pakistan (in Kharosthi script)
Kalsi, near Chakrata, Dehradun district, Uttarakhand
Girnar, near Junagadh, Gujarat (Ashoka's Major Rock Edict)
Sopara, Thane district, Maharashtra (fragments Rock Edicts 8 and 9)
Dhauli, near Bhubaneswar, Orissa (includes Kalinga Edict, excludes Rock Edicts 11–13)
Jaugada, Ganjam district, Orissa (includes Kalinga Edict, excludes Rock Edicts 11–13)
Sannati, Kalaburagi district, Karnataka (separate Rock Edicts 1 and 2, fragments Rock Edicts 13 and 14)
Yerragudi, near Gooty, Kurnool district, Andhra Pradesh (Major Rock Edicts and Minor Rock Edict)

Major Pillar Edicts (set of 7)

Kandahar, Afghanistan (fragments of Pillar Edicts VII)
Ranigat, Khyber Pakhtunkhwa, Pakistan
Delhi-Meerut, Delhi ridge, Delhi (Pillar Edicts I, II, III, IV, V, VI; moved from Meerut to Delhi by Feroz Shah)
Delhi-Topra, Feroz Shah Kotla, Delhi (Pillar Edicts I, II, III, IV, V, VI, VII; moved from Topra to Delhi by Feroz Shah)
Vaishali, Bihar (has no inscription)
Rampurva, Champaran, Bihar (Pillar Edicts I, II, III, IV, V, VI)
Lauriya-Nandangarth, Champaran, Bihar (Pillar Edicts I, II, III, IV, V, VI)
Lauriya-Araraj, Champaran, Bihar (Pillar Edicts I, II, III, IV, V, VI)

See also

 Related topics
 Ancient iron production
 Ashokan Edicts in Delhi
 Ashoka's Major Rock Edicts
 Dhar iron pillar
 Gandharan Buddhism
 Greco-Buddhism
 History of metallurgy in South Asia
 Iron pillar of Delhi
 Pillars of Ashoka
 Stambha
 Other similar topics
 Burmese pagoda
 Early Indian epigraphy
 Buddhist temple architecture
 History of India 
 Indian copper plate inscriptions
 Indian rock-cut architecture 
 List of rock-cut temples in India 
 Outline of ancient India
 South Indian Inscriptions
 Tagundaing

Notes

References

Further reading

External links

The Geographical Locations of The Rock Edicts of Asoka

Edicts of Ashoka
 
Edicts of Ashoka
Edicts of Ashoka
Memorials to Ashoka
Lists of monuments and memorials in India